The 1975 Ohio State Buckeyes football team represented the Ohio State University in the 1975 Big Ten Conference football season. The Buckeyes compiled an 11–1 record, including the 1976 Rose Bowl in Pasadena, California, where they lost, 23–10, to the UCLA Bruins.

In 1975, Archie Griffin became college football's only two-time Heisman trophy winner.  Griffin won four Big Ten Conference titles with the Ohio State Buckeyes and became the only player ever to start in four Rose Bowls.

Schedule

Personnel

Depth chart

Coaching staff
 Woody Hayes - Head Coach (25th year)
 George Chaump - Offense (8th year)
 George Hill - Defensive Coordinator (5th year)
 Charles Clausen - Defense (5th year)
 Alex Gibbs - Offensive Coordinator/ Offensive Line (1st year)
 Mickey Jackson - (2nd year)
 John Mummey - Quarterbacks (7th year)
 Ralph Staub - (6th year)
 Dick Walker - Defensive Backs (7th year)
 Jeff Kaplan - 'brain coach' & counselor (3rd year)

Game summaries

Michigan State

Penn State

UCLA

Purdue

    
    
    
    
    
    
    

Archie Griffin broke Cornell's Ed Marinaro NCAA career rushing record with a 23-yard run up the middle in the fourth quarter.

Minnesota

Michigan

Awards and honors
 Archie Griffin, Heisman Trophy

1976 NFL draftees

References

Ohio State
Ohio State Buckeyes football seasons
Big Ten Conference football champion seasons
Ohio State Buckeyes football